Michael Jordan Donald Mellon (born 5 December 2003) is a Scottish professional footballer who plays for Morecambe, on loan from Burnley, as a striker.

Club career
Mellon started his career in the Academy at Manchester United before he joined Burnley at under-16 level during the summer pre-season of 2019. He featured for Tony Philliskirk's under-18 side for their tour of Prague, where he scored a late equaliser against Turkish side Altınordu on his first appearance. He played several times for the youth team during his first season at the club, before signing a two-year scholarship in July 2020. In February 2022, Mellon agreed his first professional contract, signing a three-and-a-half year deal until the summer of 2025. Mellon moved on loan to Morecambe in January 2023. Mellon made his senior debut on 24 January 2023 in a League One match away at Ipswich Town at Portman Road, losing 4–0, and his first start on 28 January at home to Bristol Rovers in a 5–1 win. He suffered a shoulder injury in March 2023, ending his season.

International career
Mellon scored his first international goal for the Scotland national under-17 football team against the Sweden under-17 team on 10 February 2020.

Personal life
His father is Micky Mellon.

Style of play
He has been described as "a physical striker capable of playing with his back to goal and with fine scoring instincts".

Career statistics
.

References

2003 births
Living people
Scottish footballers
Burnley F.C. players
Morecambe F.C. players
English Football League players
Association football forwards
Scotland youth international footballers
English footballers
Manchester United F.C. players